Umana-Ndiuno is a town in the Ezeagu Local Government Area of Enugu State in eastern Nigeria. It contains three small villages: Umu-ene, Okunato, and Owelemba.

Towns in Enugu State